Armando Cañizales Carrillo (circa 1999-3 May 2017) was a Venezuelan violist member of the National Symphony Orchestra System killed during the 2017 Venezuelan protests.

Killing 
Cañizales was going to start studying at the Central University of Venezuela Medicine School. On 3 May 2017, he was participating in a demonstration on Rio de Janeiro Avenue, in Las Mercedes urbanization, in Caracas, when he was shot at the base of his neck by a spherical metallic projectile, dying at the age of 18 years.

On 13 July, a night march was summoned in honor of those killed during the protests, including Cañizales, marching to the places where the demonstrators died. Dissident CICPC inspector Óscar Pérez made a surprise appearance in the march, before leaving and disappearing.

The killing of Armando Cañizales was documented in a report by a panel of independent experts from the Organization of American States, considering that it could constitute a crime against humanity committed in Venezuela along with other killings during the protests.

See also 

 Miguel Castillo
 Paúl Moreno
 Jairo Ortiz
 Juan Pablo Pernalete
 Neomar Lander
 Paola Ramírez
 Xiomara Scott
 Fabián Urbina
 David Vallenilla
 Timeline of the 2017 Venezuelan protests

References 

People shot dead by law enforcement officers
Venezuelan violinists
Victims of police brutality
People murdered in Venezuela
2017 deaths
Year of birth uncertain
2017 Venezuelan protests
2017 murders in Venezuela